Kwaśniewski (feminine Kwaśniewska, plural Kwaśniewscy) is the surname of:
 Aleksander Kwaśniewski (born 1954), Polish politician and journalist
 Aleksandra Kwaśniewska (born 1978), Polish singer-songwriter
  (born 1970), Polish teacher and politician
 Dylan Kwasniewski (born 1995), American auto racing driver
  (born 1937), Polish physician
  (born 1928), Polish female sailor
  (born 1942), Polish sociologist
 Jolanta Kwaśniewska (born 1955), Polish lawyer and charity activist
  (born 1927), Polish sociologist
 Maria Kwaśniewska (1913–2007), Polish athlete
  (1871–1941), Polish politician
  (born 1963), Polish contemporary artist, performer
  (born 1966), Polish rock guitarist/singer, songwriter
  (1886–1956), Brigadier General WP
  (1898–1944), journalist, columnist, a member of the Warsaw Uprising
  (1752–1813), Brigadier General WP
 Wiesława Kwaśniewska (born  1933), Polish actress
 , official of the Second Republic, connected with Lviv
 Zbigniew Kwaśniewski (born 1948), Polish footballer

It sometimes takes the form Quasniewski, especially in German-speaking areas.

References

Polish-language surnames